Steeple House railway station was a minor station on the Cromford and High Peak Railway on the outskirts of Wirksworth, Derbyshire. The station opened in 1855 to passengers but was closed in 1876. There were several sidings around the station serving limestone quarries. The line remained in use until 21 April 1967, when it closed to all mineral traffic. Today, the Steeplehouse Grange Light Railway is located east of the former site. The National Stone Centre is also located nearby to the site. Only the trackbed remains as the High Peak Trail.

Today, a section of the former line is used by the Steeplehouse Grange Light Railway.

Route

See also 
Steeplehouse & Wirksworth Goods Yard

References 

Railway stations in Derbyshire
1855 establishments in England
Derbyshire